"I'll Love You More (Than You'll Need)" is a single by American country music artist Jeannie Seely. The single was written by Hank Cochran and was released in October 1967, peaking at #10 on the Billboard Magazine Hot Country Singles chart, becoming Seely's second top ten hit. An album of the same name was issued following the single's success.

Chart performance

References 

1967 singles
Jeannie Seely songs
Songs written by Hank Cochran
Song recordings produced by Fred Foster
Monument Records singles
1967 songs